5-Methoxysalicylic acid is a chemical compound. It is a component of castoreum, the exudate from the castor sacs of the mature beaver.

A mixture of 5-methoxysalicylic acid and spermine can be used as a matrix for oligonucleotides analysis in MALDI mass spectrometry.

It is an isomer of vanillic acid.

References 

Salicylic acids
Phenol ethers